On 18 June 2000, just before midnight, 58 dead bodies were found in a lorry in the port town of Dover, United Kingdom. Two people were found alive but injured and taken to hospital.

Incident 
The Dutch lorry came from a ferry that had arrived from Zeebrugge in Belgium. It was selected for examination by officers from HM Customs & Excise who then called the police and ambulance service. It was determined that the deceased were illegal immigrants, and likely died of asphyxiation, though carbon monoxide poisoning was not ruled out. The 60 people were trapped in the container for more than 18 hours, when the outside temperature reached 32 °C (90 °F). The survivors were found closest to the doors.

Casualties 
It was confirmed by police that all the deceased were Chinese immigrants, 54 men and 4 women. The incident was one of the largest mass killings in British criminal history, and the largest involving illegal immigrants entering the United Kingdom, the second being Essex lorry deaths, where all 39 Vietnamese immigrants were found dead in a truck in Essex. The 60 Chinese had paid £20,000 each. They were flown from Beijing to Belgrade, then driven to Zeebrugge.

Investigation and prosecution 
The trailer was owned by a newly formed Dutch haulage company, 'Van Der Spek Transporten', which had been registered days before the incident. A similarly named, legitimate, Dutch haulage company was not involved. The driver of the lorry was Perry Wacker, 33, of Rotterdam. Wacker was arrested at the scene and, in 2001, was sentenced to 14 years in prison for manslaughter for his part in an organised people smuggling operation, coordinated by a Chinese snakehead gang. He was also found guilty of conspiracy to facilitate the entry of illegal immigrants.

In 2003, nine Chinese gang members were jailed in the Netherlands for their part in the tragedy.

Survivors 
The two survivors were initially hospitalised with extreme dehydration; they were subsequently given conditional leave to remain in Britain for four years.

See also 
 2004 Morecambe Bay cockling disaster
 Burgenland corpses discovery
 Essex lorry deaths
 Mozambique people smuggling disaster
 Ranong human-smuggling incident
 List of migrant vehicle incidents in Europe

References 

2000 crimes in the United Kingdom
2000 disasters in the United Kingdom
2000 in England
2000 in international relations
2000s in Kent
2000s trials
Chinese community in the United Kingdom
Crime in Kent
Disasters in Kent
2000 incident
Illegal immigration to the United Kingdom
June 2000 crimes
June 2000 events in the United Kingdom
Manslaughter in the United Kingdom
Manslaughter trials
Migrant disasters in the United Kingdom
Triad (organized crime)
Trials in England
Trials in the Netherlands